Kleszczele (Klishcheli,  Kljaščè́li) is a town in Hajnówka County,  Podlaskie Voivodeship, north-eastern Poland.  Prior to 1999, it was in Białystok Voivodeship (1975–1998).

Demography
The most spoken languages in Kleszczele according to the Russian Imperial Census of 1897:

Notable residents
The Yiddish playwright Peretz Hirschbein was born in Kleszczele in 1881.

References

Cities and towns in Podlaskie Voivodeship
Hajnówka County
Podlachian Voivodeship
Belsky Uyezd (Grodno Governorate)
Białystok Voivodeship (1919–1939)
Belastok Region